Montréal-Mercier was a former provincial electoral district in the Montreal region of Quebec, Canada that elected members to the Legislative Assembly of Quebec.

It was created for the 1923 election from part of Montréal-Dorion and Montréal-Laurier electoral districts.  Its final election was in 1962.  It disappeared in the 1966 election and its successor electoral district was Mercier.

Members of the Legislative Assembly
Adolphe L'Archevêque, Conservative Party (1923–1927)
Anatole Plante, Liberal (1927–1936)
Gérard Thibeault, Union Nationale (1936–1939)
Joseph-Achille Francoeur, Liberal (1939–1948)
Gérard Thibeault, Union Nationale (1948–1962)
Jean-Baptiste Crépeau, Liberal (1962–1966)

Election results

|-

|-

|-
 
|Independent Lib.
|Réal Clouette
|align="right"|764
|align="right"|2.43
|align="right"|-
|-
|}

|-

|-

|-
|}

|-

|-

|-
|-

|-
 
|Social Democratic
|Marie-Ange Gill
|align="right"|162
|align="right"|0.54
|align="right"|-2.79
|-
 
|Canadian Labour
|John Monk
|align="right"|89
|align="right"|0.29
|align="right"|-
|}

|-

|-

|-
 
|CCF
|James Doyle
|align="right"|1,044
|align="right"|3.33
|align="right"|-
|-
 
|Independent Lib.
|Raymond Lévesque
|align="right"|89
|align="right"|0.29
|align="right"|-
|-
|}

|-

|-

|-
 
|Union des électeurs
|Lucien-Octave Samson
|align="right"|1,347
|align="right"|4.36
|align="right"|-
|-
 
|Independent Lib.
|Émile Naud
|align="right"|337
|align="right"|1.07
|align="right"|-
|}

|}

 
|ALN
|Paul Gouin
|align="right"|1,524
|align="right"|13.19
|align="right"|-
|-
 
|Independent U.N.
|Antonio Vermette
|align="right"|35
|align="right"|0.30
|align="right"|-
|}

|-

|-

|-
 
|Independent U.N.
|Lucien Duchaîne
|align="right"|299
|align="right"|1.87
|align="right"|-
|}

|-

|-
 
|ALN
|Calixte Cormier
|align="right"|8,295
|align="right"|45.77
|align="right"|-
|-
 
|Independent Lib.
|J. Odilon Boiteau
|align="right"|757
|align="right"|4.18
|align="right"|-
|}

|-

|-

|Conservative
|Joseph-Eugène Gagné
|align="right"|6,311
|align="right"|39.44
|align="right"|-9.45
|-
 
|Independent
|Harry Blanshay
|align="right"|177
|align="right"|1.11
|align="right"|-
|}

|-

|-

|Conservative
|Adolphe L’Archevêque
|align="right"|4,837
|align="right"|48.89
|align="right"|-9.01
|}

|-

|Conservative
|Adolphe L’Archevêque
|align="right"|4,807
|align="right"|57.90
|-

|-
 
|Labour
|Narcisse Arcand
|align="right"|925
|align="right"|11.14
|}

References
 Election results (National Assembly)
 Election results (QuebecPolitique.com)

Former provincial electoral districts of Quebec